Gomphosphaeria (sometimes written Gonphosphaeria) is a genus of cyanobacteria belonging to the family Gomphosphaeriaceae.

The genus was first described by Friedrich Traugott Kützing in 1836.

The genus has cosmopolitan distribution.

Species:
 Gomphosphaeria aponina
 Gomphosphaeria salina
 Gomphosphaeria virieuxii

References

Chroococcales
Cyanobacteria genera